Keaton Wallace (born February 26, 1999) is an American professional basketball player for the Ontario Clippers of the NBA G League. He played college basketball for the UTSA Roadrunners.

High school career
Wallace played basketball for Richardson High School in Richardson, Texas. As a senior, he averaged 22.2 points, 4.6 assists and 3.9 rebounds per game, earning District 9-6A Offensive Player of the Year honors.

College career
As a freshman at UTSA, Wallace averaged 11.4 points, 3.1 rebounds and 2.7 assists per game, and was named to the Conference USA All-Freshman Team. Entering his sophomore season, he gained about 20 lbs (9.1 kg) of muscle from the start of his college career and became an improved scorer. Wallace formed the highest-scoring backcourt in nation with Jhivvan Jackson. On February 2, 2019, he recorded a career-high 45 points, the fourth-most in a game in program history, and seven rebounds in a 116–106 win against Marshall. As a sophomore, Wallace averaged 20.2 points, five rebounds and 2.4 assists per game, receiving Second Team All-Conference USA honors. He set a program single-season record with 121 three-pointers. 

On December 3, 2019, Wallace posted a junior season-high 31 points, nine rebounds and five assists in an 89–67 win over Texas A&M–Corpus Christi. He recorded the most free throws without a miss (15) in program history. As a junior, Wallace averaged 18.8 points, 4.5 rebounds and 3.1 assists per game, repeating on the Second Team All-Conference USA. On February 5, 2021, he recorded a senior season-high 33 points and seven rebounds in an 87–80 win against FIU. As a senior, Wallace averaged 16.8 points, 5.5 rebounds and 3.4 assists per game, and was named to the Second Team All-Conference USA for a third time. He left as the second-leading scorer in program history behind Jhivvan Jackson. Wallace declared for the 2021 NBA draft, forgoing his additional year of college eligibility.

Professional career

Ontario Clippers (2021–present)
After going undrafted in the 2021 NBA draft, Wallace joined the Memphis Grizzlies for the 2021 NBA Summer League. He was selected with the ninth pick of the second round of the 2021 NBA G League draft by the Wisconsin Herd and subsequently traded to the Ontario Clippers, joining the team on October 27.

On February 21, 2023, Wallace agreed to a two-way contract with the Los Angeles Clippers. He was waived by the Clippers on March 1, without having played a game at the NBA level. On March 4, 2023, Wallace was reacquired by the Ontario Clippers.

Career statistics

College

|-
| style="text-align:left;"| 2017–18
| style="text-align:left;"| UTSA
| 35 || 20 || 27.6 || .365 || .332 || .742 || 3.1 || 2.7 || .8 || .4 || 11.4
|-
| style="text-align:left;"| 2018–19
| style="text-align:left;"| UTSA
| 32 || 32 || 34.9 || .422 || .382 || .856 || 5.0 || 2.4 || 1.3 || .7 || 20.2
|-
| style="text-align:left;"| 2019–20
| style="text-align:left;"| UTSA
| 32 || 32 || 34.8 || .395 || .351 || .806 || 4.5 || 3.1 || 1.3 || .3 || 18.8
|-
| style="text-align:left;"| 2020–21
| style="text-align:left;"| UTSA
| 26 || 26 || 33.6 || .420 || .319 || .788 || 5.5 || 3.4 || 1.0 || .3 || 16.8
|- class="sortbottom"
| style="text-align:center;" colspan="2"| Career
| 125 || 110 || 32.6 || .401 || .351 || .806 || 4.4 || 2.8 || 1.1 || .4 || 16.6

Personal life
Wallace's younger brother, Cason, is among the top high school basketball players in the 2022 class. He is a cousin of former NBA player Terrel Harris.

References

External links
UTSA Roadrunners bio

1999 births
Living people
Agua Caliente Clippers players
American men's basketball players
Basketball players from Dallas
Point guards
Shooting guards
UTSA Roadrunners men's basketball players